The Strongest is a 1929 Swedish silent drama film directed by Axel Lindblom and Alf Sjöberg and starring Bengt Djurberg, Anders Henrikson and Gösta Gustafson. It was Sjöberg's debut film as a director. It was shot at the Råsunda Studios and on location in Norway. The film's sets were designed by the art director Vilhelm Bryde.

Cast
 Bengt Djurberg as Gustaf
 Anders Henrikson as Ole
 Gösta Gustafson as Jens
 Gun Holmqvist as Ingeborg Larsen
 Kare Pederson as Kare
 Hjalmar Peters as Larsen
 Maria Röhr as Grandmother
 Sivert Brækemo as Olsen

References

Bibliography
 Gustafsson, Tommy. Masculinity in the Golden Age of Swedish Cinema: A Cultural Analysis of 1920s Films. McFarland, 2014.
 Kwiatkowski, Aleksander.  Swedish Film Classics: A Pictorial Survey of 25 Films from 1913 to 1957. Courier Dover Publications, 1983.

External links
 

1929 films
1929 drama films
1929 directorial debut films
1920s Swedish-language films
Swedish drama films
Swedish silent feature films
Swedish black-and-white films
Films directed by Alf Sjöberg
Films shot in Norway
Silent drama films
1920s Swedish films